Cyril Henry Drake (9 January 1922 – 5 February 1992) was an English cricketer. Drake was a right-handed batsman who bowled right-arm fast. He was born at Leicester, Leicestershire.

Drake made his first-class debut for Leicestershire against Cambridge University at Fenner's in 1939. He made seven further first-class appearances for the county in 1939, with his final first-class appearance coming against Derbyshire at Aylestone Road, Leicester. In his eight first-class matches, he took a total of 19 wickets at an average of 31.84, with best figures of 5/21. These figures were his only five wicket haul and came against Warwickshire at Edgbaston. With the bat, he scored 43 runs at a batting average of 5.37, with a high score of 13.

He died at Glenfield, Leicestershire, on 5 February 1992.

References

External links
Cyril Drake at ESPNcricinfo
Cyril Drake at CricketArchive

1922 births
1992 deaths
Cricketers from Leicester
English cricketers
Leicestershire cricketers